This is a survey of the postage stamps and postal history of the Czech Republic.

The Czech Republic is a country in Central Europe which borders Poland to the northeast, Germany to the west and northwest, Austria to the south and Slovakia to the east.

First stamps 
The first stamps of the Czech Republic were issued on 20 January 1993 after the former Czechoslovakia was split into the Slovak Republic and the Czech Republic from 1 January 1993. Before then, stamps of the Czechoslovak Republic were in use and were still valid until 30 September 1993. Stamps of the Czech Republic are marked Česká republika.

First stamps was printed printing house by the Ministry of Communication - the Czech Post's Technical Centre of Machines. After privatization in 1992 The Postal Printing House of Securities Prague, Inc. = Poštovní tiskárna cenin Praha a.s.

Stamp booklets 
Over 100 stamp booklets have been issued to date.

See also 

Postage stamps and postal history of Czechoslovakia
Postage stamps and postal history of Slovakia
Society for Czechoslovak Philately

References

External links
 Czechoslovak Philatelic Society of Great Britain
 Stamp Domain Czech pages.
 Czech Printing House - printing postage stamps for czech and slovakia.

Further reading 
Czechout the journal of the Czechoslovak Philatelic Society of Great Britain.

History of the Czech Republic by topic
Postal system of the Czech Republic
Czech Republic